Choi Bo-gun  (born 28 August 1991) is a South Korean snowboarder.
 
He competed in the 2009, 2011, 2013, 2015 and 2017 FIS Snowboard World Championships, and in the 2018 Winter Olympics, in parallel giant slalom.

References

External links

1991 births
Living people
South Korean male snowboarders 
Olympic snowboarders of South Korea 
Snowboarders at the 2018 Winter Olympics 
Asian Games medalists in snowboarding
Snowboarders at the 2017 Asian Winter Games
Asian Games silver medalists for South Korea
Medalists at the 2017 Asian Winter Games
Universiade silver medalists for South Korea
Universiade medalists in snowboarding
Competitors at the 2015 Winter Universiade
20th-century South Korean people
21st-century South Korean people